The following is a list of ecoregions in Kenya, as identified by the Worldwide Fund for Nature (WWF).

Terrestrial ecoregions
by major habitat type

Tropical and subtropical moist broadleaf forests

 East African montane forests
 Albertine Rift montane forests

Tropical and subtropical grasslands, savannas, and shrublands

 East Sudanian savanna
 Northern Acacia–Commiphora bushlands and thickets
 Northern Congolian forest–savanna mosaic
 Victoria Basin forest–savanna mosaic

Flooded grasslands and savannas

 East African halophytics
 Zambezian flooded grasslands

Montane grasslands and shrublands

 East African montane moorlands
 Rwenzori–Virunga montane moorlands

Freshwater ecoregions
by bioregion

Nilo-Sudan

 Upper Nile

Great Lakes

 Lakes Kivu, Edward, George, and Victoria

References
 Burgess, Neil, Jennifer D’Amico Hales, Emma Underwood (2004). Terrestrial Ecoregions of Africa and Madagascar: A Conservation Assessment. Island Press, Washington DC.
 Thieme, Michelle L. (2005). Freshwater Ecoregions of Africa and Madagascar: A Conservation Assessment. Island Press, Washington DC.

 
Uganda
Ecoregions